Eugene Campbell may refer to:

 Eugene Campbell (ice hockey) (1932–2013), American ice hockey player
 Eugene E. Campbell (1915–1986), American professor of history